Suganuma Dam is a gravity dam located in Toyama prefecture in Japan. The dam is used for power production. The catchment area of the dam is 43.1 km2. The dam impounds about 8  ha of land when full and can store 524 thousand cubic meters of water. The construction of the dam was started on 1956 and completed in 1958.

References

Dams in Toyama Prefecture
1958 establishments in Japan